Theodorias (from ) can refer to:

 Theodorias (province), Byzantine province in Syria, established in 528 and named after the Byzantine empress Theodora.
 Olbia, Libya a town in Cyrenaica refounded by and named after the Byzantine empress Theodora.
 Vaga, an ancient city in Tunisia now called Béja, it was also named Theodorias during the Byzantine rule.